{{DISPLAYTITLE:C18H26O2}}
The molecular formula C18H26O2 (molar mass: 274.40 g/mol, exact mass: 274.1933 u) may refer to:

 Empenthrin, or vaporthrin
 Nandrolone, or 19-nortestosterone